Jordyn Pamela Huitema (born May 8, 2001) is a Canadian professional soccer player who plays as a forward for National Women's Soccer League club OL Reign and the Canada national team.

She scored her first national team goal at the age of 16, became the top Canadian scorer in the UEFA Women's Champions League before she turned 20 and has been named as a potential heir to Canadian legend Christine Sinclair.

Early life 
Huitema was born in Chilliwack, British Columbia. She began playing soccer at four years of age with Chilliwack FC. She attended middle school at Rosedale Middle School in Chilliwack. She attended Burnaby Central Secondary as part of the Whitecaps FC Girls Elite REX program. Her brother, Brody, was a member of the Vancouver Whitecaps Residency program and played for Duke University. Her second brother, Trent, played ice hockey in the Saskatchewan Junior Hockey League for the Humboldt Broncos.

Club career

Early career 
Huitema would sign with TSS FC Rovers of the Women's Premier Soccer League for the 2018 season.

Paris Saint-Germain 
On July 23, 2018, it was announced that Huitema would play with PSG Féminines during the 2018 Women's International Champions Cup (WICC). She did not sign a professional contract with the team, allowing her to maintain college eligibility. She started for PSG during their pre-season friendly against Manchester City Women on July 24, at the University of Portland. Huitema was also in the starting lineup for PSG's semi-final match in the International Champions Cup, they lost 2–1 to the North Carolina Courage.

On January 24, 2019, Huitema announced that she would forgo college and turn pro. On May 17, 2019, PSG confirmed Huitema had signed a four-year contract with the club.

On June 4, 2021, Huitema scored a header in the final minutes of a 3–0 victory over Dijon to seal the Division 1 Féminine title for Paris Saint-Germain, the first league title for the club.

OL Reign 
On June 18, 2022, Huitema transferred to American club OL Reign and signed a two-year contract. In the final of the 2022 edition of The Women's Cup, she scored her first goal for the team to give the Reign a 2–1 lead over Racing Louisville FC, ultimately proving to be the game-winning goal. She scored two goals in the remainder of the regular season, the second in the season-ending match with the Orlando Pride that saw the Reign clinch the NWSL Shield.

International career

Youth 

Huitema made her first junior appearance for Canada with the national under-15 team on August 7, 2014, against Puerto Rico in a 5–0 victory at the CONCACAF Girls Under-15 Championship. The Canadians would go on to win the inaugural edition of the tournament in a penalty shoot-out, with Huitema scoring the winning shoot-out goal. She would go on to make 10 more appearances for the under-15 squad. Huitema's debut for the under-17 team came on March 3, 2016, at the CONCACAF Women's Under-17 Championship in a 3–0 win against Guatemala. Huitema also played in the 2016 FIFA U-17 Women's World Cup. There, she scored her first goal in FIFA competition in a 3–2 win over Cameroon. She made 7 more appearances for the under-17 team. On July 6, 2017, Huitema made her first appearance for the under-20 team, scoring a goal in a 4–1 win over the United States. After scoring in a 3–1 loss to China in an under 17 match on July 12, 2017, Huitema became the first Canadian to score for the under 17, under 20 and senior national team in the same calendar year. In 2017, she was named the Canada U-17 Female Player of the Year for her performances with the U-17, U-20 and senior teams throughout the year. On January 12, 2018, Huitema was named to Canada's squad for the 2018 CONCACAF Women's U-20 Championship in Trinidad and Tobago. In the first game of the tournament, Huitema scored twice in a 3–1 win over Costa Rica. In the second game, Huitema scored a hat-trick in a 4–1 win over hosts Trinidad & Tobago, which clinched Canada's progress into the semi-finals. She would play 66 minutes in a 4–0 victory over Haiti which resulted in Canada winning their group. In the semi-finals against Mexico, Huitema played the full game in a 1–1 draw. Canada would lose the match 4–3 on penalty kicks in which Huitema saw her attempt saved. Canada would require a win over Haiti in the third place match to qualify for the FIFA U-20 Women's World Cup in France later in the year. Canada would lose the match by a score of 1–0 and fail to qualify for the World Cup. Huitema was the tournament's top scorer with five goals and was named to the Best XI of the championship.

Senior 

Her senior national team debut came on March 8, 2017, in the final of the 2017 Algarve Cup versus Spain. The cap made her the third youngest player to appear in a match for the senior national team. Her first goal for the senior team came on June 11, 2017, in a friendly against Costa Rica at BMO Field in Toronto. The tally made her the second youngest goal scorer in the history of the national team. She would score a second goal less than a minute later. Huitema received a call-up to the national team for a two-game friendly series against the United States on November 9 and 12, 2017. She came into the first game as a substitute in the 90th minute for Janine Beckie at BC Place in Vancouver. In February 2018, Huitema was called into Canada's squad for the 2018 Algarve Cup by new coach Kenneth Heiner-Møller. Huitema would start the second match for Canada against Russia, drawing a first half penalty which was converted by captain Christine Sinclair, the lone goal in a 1–0 victory.

Huitema was slated to make her FIFA Women's World Cup debut after being named to the Canadian squad for the 2019 edition in France. The event ended in disappointment for the Canadians, who were eliminated in the Round of 16 by the Netherlands.

The 2020 CONCACAF Women's Olympic Qualifying Championship proved to be a major showcase for Huitema, who lead the whole tournament in scoring with seven goals, including five goals in the group stage game against Jamaica and the lone goal in Canada's 1–0 semi-final victory over Costa Rica that resulted in Canada qualifying for the 2020 Summer Olympics in Tokyo. Shortly afterward, the onset of the COVID-19 pandemic delayed the Tokyo Olympics by a year. Huitema was named to the Canadian Olympic team. In the women's tournament Canada advanced to the Olympic final for the first time in its history, winning the gold medal. Huitema substituted Christine Sinclair at the 86 minute mark, playing 36 minutes in the championship game.

Personal life 
Huitema was in a long-term relationship with Bayern Munich player and fellow Canadian Alphonso Davies from 2017 to 2022. On May 22, 2022, Davies confirmed on social media that the two had separated.
On November 1, 2022, it was confirmed that Huitema is dating Seattle Mariners baseball player Julio Rodríguez.

Career statistics

Club

International

Scores and results list Canada's goal tally first, score column indicates score after each Huitema goal.

Honours 
Paris Saint-Germain
 Division 1 Féminine: 2020–21
 Coupe de France féminine: 2021–22; runner-up: 2019–20

OL Reign
 NWSL Shield: 2022
 The Women's Cup: 2022

Canada
 Summer Olympics: 2021

Individual
Canada U-20 Female Player of the Year: 2018
Canada U-17 Female Player of the Year: 2017
CONCACAF Women's Olympic Qualifying Best XI: 2020
CONCACAF Women's Olympic Qualifying Golden Boot: 2020
CONCACAF Women's U-20 Championship Best XI: 2018
CONCACAF Women's U-20 Championship Golden Boot: 2018
CONCACAF Girls' Under-15 Championship Best XI: 2016
 Vancouver Whitecaps FC Most Promising Player–Female: 2017

References

External links 

 
 
 

2001 births
Living people
Canadian people of Dutch descent
People from Chilliwack
Soccer people from British Columbia
Canadian women's soccer players
Women's association football forwards
Paris Saint-Germain Féminine players
Division 1 Féminine players
Olympic soccer players of Canada
Canada women's international soccer players
2019 FIFA Women's World Cup players
Footballers at the 2020 Summer Olympics
Canadian expatriate soccer players
Canadian expatriate sportspeople in France
Expatriate women's footballers in France
Olympic medalists in football
Medalists at the 2020 Summer Olympics
Olympic gold medalists for Canada
National Women's Soccer League players